Petković is a Croatian, Bosnian, Montenegrin and Serbian surname. It may refer to:

Andrea Petkovic (born 1987), German tennis player
Bruno Petković (born 1994), Croatian football player
Dejan Petković (born 1972), Serbian football player
Dušan Petković (footballer born 1974), Serbian former footballer
Dušan Petković (footballer born 1903) (1903–1979), Serbian and Yugoslav football forward
Eva Haljecka Petković (1870–1947), Serbian doctor
Goran Petković (born 1975), Serbian football player
Igor Petković (born 1983), Serbian football player
Ilija Petković (1945–2020), Serbian footballer and football manager
Jason Petkovic (born 1972), Australian football (soccer) player
Marija Petković (The Blessed Mary of Jesus Crucified Petković) (1892–1966), Croatian Roman Catholic nun
Marinko Petković (born 1976), Serbian footballer
Marjan Petković (born 1979), German football player
Michael Petkovic (born 1976), Australian football (soccer) player
Milivoj Petković (born 1949), Croatian army officer
Miodrag Petković (born 1948), Serbian mathematician and computer scientist
Momir Petković (born 1953), Greco-Roman wrestling champion from former Yugoslavia
Nikola Petković (born 1986), Serbian football player
Nina Petković (born 1981), Montenegrin singer, musician and television personality
Veljko Petković (born 1977), Serbian volleyball player
Vladimir Petković (born 1963), Bosnian-Swiss football manager and former player
Vladislav Petković Dis, Serbian poet
Zlata Petković (1954–2012), Serbian actress

References

See also
 

Croatian surnames
Serbian surnames
Patronymic surnames